The 2018 Big Ten men's basketball tournament was the postseason men's basketball tournament for the Big Ten Conference of the 2017–18 NCAA Division I men's basketball season. It was held from February 28 through March 4, 2018 at Madison Square Garden in New York City. Due to the Big East's use of that venue for their conference tournament, the Big Ten tournament took place one week earlier than usual, ending the week before Selection Sunday.

Michigan defeated Purdue in the championship game to win their second consecutive tournament championship. As a result, they received the conference's automatic bid to the NCAA tournament.

The tournament was the second Big Ten Conference tournament held outside the conference's traditional heartland in the Midwest following the 2017 tournament held at the Verizon Center in Washington, D.C.

Seeds
All 14 Big Ten schools participated in the tournament. Teams were seeded by conference record, with a tiebreaker system used to seed teams with identical conference records. The top 10 teams received a first round bye and the top four teams received a double bye. Tiebreaking procedures remained unchanged from the 2017 Tournament.

Schedule

Bracket

* denotes overtime period

Game summaries

First round

Second round

Quarterfinals

Semifinals

Championship

Sponsorship 
Financial firm SoFi acquired presenting sponsorship of the tournament as part of a multi-year deal, including signage, presenting sponsorship of BTN telecasts of the tournament, and on-site marketing presences. The Tournament was branded as the 2018 Big Ten Conference men's basketball tournament presented by SoFi for sponsorship reasons.

All-Tournament Team
Moritz Wagner, Michigan – Big Ten tournament Most Outstanding Player
Muhammad-Ali Abdur-Rahkman, Michigan
Carsen Edwards, Purdue
Tony Carr, Penn State
Corey Sanders, Rutgers

References

Big Ten men's basketball tournament
Tournament
Big Ten Conference men's basketball tournament
2010s in Manhattan
Big Ten men's basketball tournament
Basketball competitions in New York City
College sports in New York City
Madison Square Garden
Sports in Manhattan